William Samuel "Ding Dong" Bell (October 24, 1933 – October 11, 1962) was a Major League Baseball pitcher. In 5 career games, he had a 0–1 record, with a 4.32 ERA. He batted and threw right-handed.

In 1952, Bell threw three no-hitters while pitching in the Appalachian League. The only other person to do this in professional baseball history is Tom Drees.

Bell was killed in a car accident in Durham, North Carolina on October 11, 1962.

References

External links

1933 births
1962 deaths
Pittsburgh Pirates players
Major League Baseball pitchers
Columbus/Gastonia Pirates players
Portland Beavers players
Lincoln Chiefs players
Asheville Tourists players
Kinston Eagles players
Denver Bears players
San Antonio Missions players
Burlington-Graham Pirates players
Bristol Twins players
Mayfield Clothiers players
Baseball players from North Carolina
Road incident deaths in North Carolina
People from Goldsboro, North Carolina